Parkland is a census-designated place (CDP) in Pierce County, Washington. The population was 35,803 at the time of the 2010 census and had grown to 38,623 as of the 2020 census. It is an unincorporated suburb of the city of Tacoma and is home to Pacific Lutheran University.

Parkland borders most of Tacoma's southern cutoff at 96th St, and borders with much of the northern cutoff of Spanaway, Washington, at 152nd St (or Military Rd E). 

The most influential motorway is State Route 7/Pacific Ave, which travels north and south, and leads from Interstate 5 in Tacoma all the way to Mount Rainier. Pacific Ave is also a main commercial corridor through much of the county, including Parkland.

It was given its name by early white settlers for the park-like nature of the vast Garry Oak and blue camas flower prairie, and the many meandering creeks crossing it. In 1890, Norwegian-Americans from the Midwest chose this area as the site of their new college, which is now Pacific Lutheran University, home to 3,500 full-time students and the Lutes varsity sports teams.

Geography
Parkland is located at  (47.141221, -122.437746).

According to the United States Census Bureau, the CDP has a total area of 7.4 square miles (19.1 km2), of which, 7.4 square miles (19.1 km2) of it is land and 0.04 square miles (0.1 km2) of it (0.41%) is water.

Demographics

As of the census of 2000, there were 24,053 people, 8,869 households, and 5,782 families residing in the CDP. The population density was 3,267.2 people per square mile (1,261.8/km2). There were 9,340 housing units at an average density of 1,268.7/sq mi (490.0/km2). The racial makeup of the CDP was 73.91% White, 8.07% African American, 1.04% Native American, 6.64% Asian, 1.81% Pacific Islander, 2.06% from other races, and 6.47% from two or more races. Hispanic or Latino of any race were 5.33% of the population.

There were 8,869 households, out of which 32.6% had children under the age of 18 living with them, 45.8% were married couples living together, 14.1% had a female householder with no husband present, and 34.8% were non-families. 26.3% of all households were made up of individuals, and 7.4% had someone living alone who was 65 years of age or older. The average household size was 2.55 and the average family size was 3.05.

In the CDP, the age distribution of the population shows 25.0% under the age of 18, 16.9% from 18 to 24, 28.3% from 25 to 44, 19.7% from 45 to 64, and 10.1% who were 65 years of age or older. The median age was 31 years. For every 100 females, there were 94.2 males. For every 100 females age 18 and over, there were 90.8 males.

The median income for a household in the CDP was $39,653, and the median income for a family was $46,210. Males had a median income of $36,169 versus $27,036 for females. The per capita income for the CDP was $18,649. About 10.6% of families and 15.4% of the population were below the poverty line, including 18.7% of those under age 18 and 6.5% of those age 65 or over.

Education
Most of Parkland is within the Franklin Pierce School District. , the district had 7,942 students enrolled.

The following schools have portions of Parkland CDP in their attendance boundaries:
 High schools:
 Washington High School (most of the Franklin Pierce portion is zoned to this high school)
 Franklin Pierce High School (in Clover Creek)
 Middle schools:
 Keithley Middle School (most of the Franklin Pierce portion is zoned to this middle school)
 Morris E. Ford Middle School (in Midland)
 Elementary schools:
 Brookdale Elementary
 Christensen Elementary
 Elmhurst Elementary
 James Sales Elementary
 Collins Elementary (in Clover Creek)
 Midland Elementary (in Midland)
 Preschools:
 Dr. Frank Hewins Early Learning Center

Portions of Parkland are in the Bethel School District and the Clover Park School District.

Private Schools:
Parkland Lutheran School - Vikings (PreK–8th)

Parkland also holds the private college Pacific Lutheran University.

Notable people 

 Q. Allan Brocka, television and film director
 Jack Evans, professional wrestler
 Bjug Harstad, pastor and founding president of Pacific Lutheran University
 Oscar Harstad, MLB pitcher
 Nils Joseph Hong, educator and president of Pacific Lutheran University
 Demetrious Johnson, MMA fighter

References

Census-designated places in Pierce County, Washington
Census-designated places in Washington (state)